Aulus Postumius may refer to a number of different people from Roman history:

Aulus Postumius (military tribune 180 BC), one of the military tribunes in 180 BC
Aulus Postumius Albinus (disambiguation), Romans
Aulus Postumius Albus Regillensis, consul in 496 BC
Aulus Postumius Albus Regillensis (consul 464 BC)
Aulus Postumius Tubertus, master of the horse in 434 BC